Delta Antliae (δ Ant, δ Antliae) is the Bayer designation for a binary star system in the southern constellation of Antlia. The combined apparent visual magnitude of the system is +5.57, allowing it to be viewed from the suburbs with the naked eye. Judging by the parallax shift of this system, it is located at a distance of 450 ± 10 light-years from Earth. The system is reduced in magnitude by 0.03 due to extinction caused by intervening gas and dust.

The primary component of the system has a stellar classification of B9.5 V, indicating that it is a B-type main sequence star. The companion is an F-type main sequence star with a classification of F9 Ve, where the 'e' indicates that there are emission lines in the spectrum. The two stars are separated by 11 arcseconds.

Delta Antliae A, the brighter member of this system, has an estimated 3.4 times the mass of the Sun. It is radiating around 200 times as much luminosity as the Sun from its outer atmosphere at an effective temperature of 11,117 K. At this heat, it shines with the characteristic blue-white hue of a B-type star.

References

090972
Binary stars
Antliae, Delta
Antlia
B-type main-sequence stars
051376
Suspected variables
4118
Durchmusterung objects